German Empire usually refers to the unified German monarchy existing from 1871 to 1918.

German Empire may also refer to:

Holy Roman Empire, the central European empire dissolved by French Emperor Napoleon in 1806, that preceded the German Empire of 1871
 German Empire (1848–1849), a democratic, revolutionary and unified German state with its capital at Frankfurt
German Reich, the unified state of Germany over the whole period from 1871 to 1945
German colonial empire, German colonial territories (1884–1918)
Weimar Republic, (1918–1933)  
Nazi Germany, Germany between 1933 and 1945, under Führer Adolf Hitler
The planned Greater Germanic Reich (Fourth Reich)

See also
 Kingdom of Germany